The Khoo Kongsi is a large Chinese clanhouse with elaborate and highly ornamented architecture, a mark of the dominant presence of the Chinese in Penang, Malaysia. The famous Khoo Kongsi is the grandest clan temple in the country. It is also one of the city's major historic attractions. The clan temple has retained its authentic historic setting, which includes an association building, a traditional theatre and the late 19th century rowhouses for clan members, all clustered around a granite-paved square. It is located in Cannon Square in the heart of the oldest part of the city of George Town, in the midst of narrow, winding lanes and quaint-looking pre-War houses exuding a palpable old world charm.

History 
The Khoo Kongsi is a clan association of the Leong San Tong (Dragon Mountain Hall) clan, whose forefathers came from XinAn Village, Haicang District, Xiamen Municipal in Fujian province. The Khoos were among the wealthy Straits Chinese traders of 17th century Malacca and early Penang. In the 19th century, the clan complex resembled a miniature clan village, with its own self-government as well as educational, financial, welfare and social organisations. The clan temple was built in 1906 when the Khoo clan was at the height of wealth and eminence in Penang society.

The forefathers of the Khoo family who emigrated from South China built it as a clanhouse for members of the Khoo family in 1851. It was burnt down in 1901, allegedly struck by lightning, and the Chinese believed that it was due to its resemblance to the Emperor's palace, which provoked the gods. A scaled-down version was later built in 1902 and completed in 1906.
Even so, the complex boasts a magnificent hall embellished with intricate carvings and richly ornamented beams of the finest wood bearing the mark of master craftsmen from China. The clan temple is dedicated to the clan's Patron Deities and also houses a collection of ancestral tablets. Chinese operas are still staged at the theatre during the seventh lunar month.

Like many such clan associations in South East Asia, Khoo Kongsi is no longer the center of important social activities and functions that it once held. Different strategies and ideas are being implemented to redefine the place of clan associations in the 21st century. Due to its location in the UNESCO World Heritage area of George Town, it is a popular attraction for tourists interested in local culture.

Gallery

External links 

 Khoo Kongsi Official Website
 Khoo kongsi photos

World Heritage Sites in Malaysia
Religious buildings and structures in Penang
Tourist attractions in George Town, Penang
History of Penang